Chivita 100% is a juice brand manufactured by Chi Limited. It was first introduced into the Nigerian market in 1996 as Chivita Premium Fruit Juice. The brand's name was changed in 2014 to Chivita 100% to communicate to consumers that the product is made from real fruit.

Chivita 100% currently sells 6 flavours: orange, apple, pineapple, orange-pineapple, orange-mango, and red grape.

Chivita 100% is the official drink Partner of the Manchester United F.C. in Nigeria. The partnership, signed by the management of CHI Limited and Manchester United Limited allows CHI Limited to use the Manchester United's brand assets on a range of Chi products in Nigeria.

Nutritional content of Chivita 100%
Chivita markets that their products contain no preservatives, no artificial colours, and no added sugar. Chivita also calls the product a nutrient dense beverage.

Campaigns

For football fans in Nigeria, Chi Limited launched the "Chivita 100% Juiceball" promotion campaign which was kicked off by a television commercial. The commercial featured then Manchester United footballers Robin van Persie, Ángel Di María, Marouane Fellaini, Antonio Valencia, Radamel Falcao and Jonny Evans.

In popular culture
As part of the “Buy Naija to grow the Naira” campaign launched on social media, the Senator and Chairman of the Silverbird Group, Ben Murray Bruce, stated in a tweet that Chivita juice (Chivita 100%) is as good as imported juice.

Awards

References 

Juice brands